Christian puppetry is a form of Christian ministry and entertainment through puppetry.

The Muppets gave puppetry a whole new look and life in the mid-twentieth century. "Puppet-fever" engulfed Americans.  With the new public interest in puppetry, both in America and worldwide, Christians began to see the potential in this art form.

Beginning then and continuing to this day, churches in nearly every Christian denomination have started small puppet groups.  Usually such groups' purpose is to serve their own children's ministry programs, but some reach outside their own walls, performing for other churches or secular venues.  Some teams travel internationally to third-world countries, where children and adults have neither experienced this kind of entertainment, nor heard about Jesus Christ.

Christian puppetry has grown so large that thousands of performers gather yearly at festivals to showcase, share, and learn more about their art form.  One of the largest Christian puppet supplies distributors, One Way Street, hosts regional festivals to serve church teams, as well as a worldwide festival (I-Fest), lasting an entire week.

Techniques

Though rod-arm puppetry continues to be the most common technique in Christian circles, some other forms have begun to gain popularity.

Blacklight puppetry
Blacklight puppetry capitalizes on the novelty of ultra-violet lights, or black light.  Lighting the staging area with only these specialized lights, the audience can see only the objects that are coated with a special paint.  The idea of controlling what the audience sees is a major responsibility of any puppeteer, and blacklight has provided a new way of accomplishing it.

Dowel rods
Dowel rod puppetry combines interpretive dance and the use of (typically) two simple dowels. Routines usually involve a song that tells a story or conveys a message while performers move in a choreographed dance, employing their rods in equally choreographed ways.

Puppetry
Christian performing arts